The Dale class were a class of replenishment oilers taken up for service with the Royal Fleet Auxiliary, supporting the Royal Navy during the inter-war period. They went on to see action during the Second World War and supported British and allied fleet units in Cold War conflicts such as the Korean War.

Class overview
The ships were eventually acquired in three batches. The first consisted of the acquisition of six tankers under construction for the British Tanker Company in 1937. The tankers all had slightly different designs and dimensions, but had a deadweight capacity of 11,650 tons of fuel oil. These initial eight were supplemented with the purchase of two tankers under construction for Royal Dutch Shell in 1938. These two new tankers were slightly larger and faster than their earlier class members. With the outbreak of the Second World War looming the Ministry of War Transport had ordered a number of new tankers to the designs used by the Royal Dutch Shell. Of these, ten were taken over by the Royal Fleet Auxiliary while under construction, and were subsequently incorporated into their Dale class. There were plans to take over an eleventh ship, to be named RFA Eppingdale, but this was not carried out and the vessel was retained by the Ministry of War Transport. All of the ships were named after English dales, and were identified with the suffix '-dale' in their names.

Group I
The first group of six ships were under construction at a variety of yards when they were bought. Swan Hunter and Wigham Richardson Ltd and Harland and Wolff built two each, while Cammell Laird and Co. and Lithgows each produced one. Those ships that survived the war remained in service with the Royal Fleet Auxiliary, with most being disposed of in the early 1960s. The longest-lived was Bishopdale, which despite being decommissioned in 1959, was not scrapped until 1970.

Group II
Entering service just prior to the outbreak of war, both ships went on to be heavily engaged. Cairndale made numerous voyages from Britain to the African coast before being torpedoed and sunk in the Eastern Atlantic in 1941 by the Italian submarine . Cedardale saw service in the Far East, and survived the war. She continued in service throughout the 1940s and 1950s, and was scrapped in 1960.

Group III 
The third group was the largest of the Dale class. Ten new oilers that had been ordered by the Ministry of War Transport were acquired by the Royal Fleet Auxiliary to expand their capabilities. The first were ready for service in January 1939, with the final ships being completed by mid-1942. As with their earlier sisters, all saw active service in a variety of theatres. She did however continue in service throughout the war as a fuel and accommodation hulk, and was finally towed back to Britain for scrapping in 1955. Now capable of deploying 250 troops aboard 15 LCMs, they initially took part in Operation Torch, and went on to see action at later allied amphibious landings in the Mediterranean and Pacific. All three survived the war, though Ennerdale  was badly damaged by a magnetic mine in December 1945, and were converted back into oilers. The survivors all continued in service until their increasing obsolescence led to their retirement from service in the late 1950s, with most having scrapped by the early 1960s.

Ships

Notes

References

 
Auxiliary replenishment ship classes
 Dale class oiler